"My Arms Stay Open All Night" is a song written by Paul Overstreet and Don Schlitz, and recorded by American country music artist Tanya Tucker.  It was released in October 1989 as the second single from her 1989 Greatest Hits compilation album.  The song reached #2 on the Billboard Hot Country Singles & Tracks chart.

Chart performance

Year-end charts

References

1990 singles
Tanya Tucker songs
Songs written by Paul Overstreet
Songs written by Don Schlitz
Capitol Records Nashville singles
1989 songs
Song recordings produced by Jerry Crutchfield